The Calgary Expos were a minor league baseball team located in the Canadian city of Calgary, Alberta, from 1979 to 1984.  The team was a member of the Pioneer League, playing at the Rookie League level.

Calgary and the Medicine Hat A's had joined the Pioneer League as expansion teams in 1977.  At the time, Calgary was affiliated with the St. Louis Cardinals, and the team was the Calgary Cardinals. Calgary picked up the Expos moniker in 1979, when they switched affiliations to the Montreal Expos. The Expos later relocated to Salt Lake City, Utah, to become the Salt Lake City Trappers in 1985 to make room for the Calgary Cannons of the Pacific Coast League.

Notable alumni

 Bob Bailey (1979)
 Steve Boros (1980)
 Andres Galarraga (1979-1980) 5 x MLB All-Star; 1995 NL Batting Title

Season by season results

Playoffs
The Expos qualified for the playoffs twice, losing to the Butte Copper Kings 3–2 in the 1981 league championship series, and losing to the Billings Mustangs 3–1 in the 1983 series.

See also
 Calgary Expos players

References

Defunct Pioneer League (baseball) teams
Baseball teams in Calgary
Baseball teams established in 1979
Defunct baseball teams in Canada
Baseball teams in Alberta
Montreal Expos minor league affiliates
Baseball teams disestablished in 1984